This is the list of cathedrals in Nicaragua.

Roman Catholic 
Cathedrals of the Roman Catholic Church in Nicaragua:

Anglican
Cathedrals of the Anglican Church in Nicaragua:

See also
Lists of cathedrals

References

Cathedrals
Nicaragua
Cathedrals